Finklea is a surname. Notable people with the surname include:

 John Finklea (1933–2000), American physician, professor, researcher, and public health administrator
 Tula Ellice Finklea aka Cyd Charisse (1922–2008), American dancer and actress

See also
 Finklea, South Carolina
 Finkley